Znamenskoye is a rural locality (a village) in Kiprevskoye Rural Settlement, Kirzhachsky District, Vladimir Oblast, Russia. The population was 6 as of 2010. There is 1 street.

Geography 
Znamenskoye is located 17 km southeast of Kirzhach (the district's administrative centre) by road. Levakhi is the nearest rural locality.

References 

Rural localities in Kirzhachsky District